Oak Harbor is the name of some towns in the United States:

Oak Harbor, Ohio
Oak Harbor, Washington